The Fangshan Line of the Beijing Subway is a rapid transit line in western Beijing that runs from  in Fangshan District north and east to  in Fengtai District. It is mainly elevated, including 10 elevated stations and 6 underground stations. It allows residents of Beijing's western suburbs to connect to the rest of the Beijing Subway network.

It was opened on December 30, 2010. The line was extended further north from Guogongzhuang station to the southwest corner of the Third Ring Road. The northern extension opened on December 31, 2020.

Route

The line makes four stops in Liangxiang including at the Fangshan Campus of the Beijing Institute of Technology. The line then heads north to the towns of Guangyang and Changyang. After crossing the Yongding River, the Fangshan Line enters Fengtai District where the line makes two more stops, at Dabaotai near the Beijing World Park, and at Guogongzhuang, also the southern terminus of Line 9.

Stations
List of stations from northeast to southwest:

Through service 

In 2021, it was announced that there will be some through service between Line 9 and the Fangshan line. The operator is retrofitting the signal systems of both lines to achieve this. Through service started on 18 January 2023.

Future Development

Phase 3 
The Phase 3 of the line will add 10.9 km, with 8 stations. The extension start from  station on the Phase 2 of the Fangshan line and end at  station (interchange to Line 4). New interchange stations on this project includes  station (interchange to Line 14, 16, Daxing Airport Express),  station (interchange to Line 1) and  station (interchange to Line 4). According to the information released in July 2022, the extension is included in the "Beijing Rail Transit Phase III Construction Plan".

History
Construction of the Fangshan Line was originally set to begin in 2012 but was moved up to April 1, 2009, to use stimulus funding provided by the government to counter the Financial Crisis of 2007-08. The names of Phase 1 stations was announced on March 25, 2010, as a 7-day publicity.

On December 30, 2010, the line began operating from Suzhuang to Dabaotai, but was not connected to any other line of the subway system. One year later, on December 31, 2011, the Dabaotai to  section opened, linking the Fangshan Line with Line 9 and the rest of the subway network.

On December 30, 2017, the line was extended one stop westward to Yancun Dong (E).

On December 31, 2020, the line was extended north by 4 stations.

Rolling Stock

References

Beijing Subway lines
Railway lines opened in 2010
2010 establishments in China
750 V DC railway electrification